Leo Rafael Reif (born August 21, 1950) is a Venezuelan American electrical engineer and academic administrator. He previously served as the 17th president of the Massachusetts Institute of Technology from 2012 to 2022, provost of the institute from 2005 to 2012, and dean of the institute's EECS department from 2004 to 2005.

Reif sits on the boards of the World Economic Forum, the Carnegie Endowment, the Council on Foreign Relations, and the Broad Institute.

Background

Leo Rafael Reif was born in Maracaibo, Venezuela, to Eastern European Jewish parents who immigrated to Venezuela in the late 1930s through Ecuador and Colombia. His father was a photographer, and the family spoke Yiddish and Spanish at home.

Education

Reif received his undergraduate degree in electrical engineering from the Universidad de Carabobo, Valencia, Venezuela in 1973. He then served for a year as an assistant professor at the Universidad Simón Bolívar in Caracas. He went to the United States for graduate school, earning his doctorate in electrical engineering from Stanford University in 1979. He then spent a year as a visiting assistant professor in the Department of Electrical Engineering at Stanford.

Research, teaching, and administration

Reif joined the MIT faculty in January 1980 as an assistant professor of electrical engineering. He was promoted to associate professor in 1983, earned tenure in 1985, and became a full professor in 1988. In 2004, he was named the Fariborz Maseeh Professor of Emerging Technology. In 2012, Reif was elected president of MIT.

Before his appointment as Provost in 2005, his research centered on three-dimensional integrated circuit technologies and on environmentally benign microelectronics fabrication.

Reif was director of MIT's Microsystems Technology Laboratories, then associate department head for Electrical Engineering in the Department of Electrical Engineering and Computer Science (EECS), MIT's largest academic department, and then served as EECS department head in 2004–2005.

An early champion of MIT's engagement in micro- and nanotechnologies, Dr. Reif is the inventor or co-inventor on 13 patents, has edited or co-edited five books, and has supervised 38 doctoral theses.

As MIT’s provost, he spearheaded an effort to promote online learning for both on-campus students and learners around the world. The effort paved the way for edX, a massive open online course provider that MIT and Harvard University co-founded in 2012. As of 2020, 24 million unique users have taken a class on edX.

Reif was named co-chair of the administration's Advanced Manufacturing Partnership Steering Committee "2.0," part of a continuing effort to maintain U.S. leadership in the emerging technologies that will create high-quality manufacturing jobs and enhance America's global competitiveness, on September 26, 2013.

To promote innovation in “tough-tech” science and engineering fields, in 2015 he presented an idea for an “innovation orchard,” which would provide the space, mentorship, and bridge-funding for entrepreneurs to turn new science into workable products. The idea became the basis for The Engine, an accelerator aimed at fostering scientific and engineering breakthroughs.

In 2018, in response to the ubiquity of computing and the rise of artificial intelligence across disciplines, Reif announced the MIT Stephen A. Schwarzman College of Computing. The College aims to prepare students to harness the power of AI while weighing its ethical and social implications.

In 2019, in the wake of Jeffrey Epstein's indictment on child sex trafficking and subsequent suicide, it came to light that Epstein had contributed over $800,000 to MIT, much of it beginning in 2013 and well after he was convicted of child sex trafficking the first time. In August 2019, Reif ordered an investigation into Epstein's connections with the university.

In a September 12, 2019 letter to the MIT community on the institute's website, Reif admitted he signed a 2012 thank you letter to Epstein for a gift to professor Seth Lloyd. In the open letter to the community, Reif said, "I apparently signed this letter on August 16, 2012, about six weeks into my presidency. Although I do not recall it, it does bear my signature." On September 18, he explained, "Many students have asked how I could have signed that acknowledgment letter without asking questions and how I could fail to remember it. The answer is simple: I did not recognize the name, and I sign many standard thank-you letters every week. That includes several hundred letters every year thanking individuals for contributions to the Institute."

In 2020, Reif announced that MIT will donate $850,000 to four nonprofits that support survivors of sexual abuse.

In January 2021, Reif defended Gang Chen in an open letter following Chen's arrest by the Federal Bureau of Investigation on wire fraud and tax violation charges.

In February 2022, Reif announced his intention to step down as MIT president at the end of 2022, and return to the faculty of the Department of Electrical Engineering and Computer Science following a yearlong sabbatical.

Honors and awards

Reif is a fellow of the Institute for Electrical and Electronic Engineers, an elected member of the American Academy of Arts & Sciences, and a member of Tau Beta Pi and the Electrochemical Society. The Semiconductor Research Corporation (SRC) awarded him the 2000 Aristotle Award for "his commitment to the educational experience of SRC students and the profound and continuing impact he has had on their professional careers." For his work in developing MITx, MIT's initiative in developing free online college courses available to learners anywhere with an Internet connection, which was launched in December 2011, he received the 2012 Tribeca Disruptive Innovation Award. In 2015, the Woodrow Wilson National Fellowship Foundation honored him with the Frank E. Taplin, Jr. Public Intellectual Award, he was recognized as one of the Top 20 Most Influential, Outstanding, Creative and Talented Hispanic professionals working in the US Technology Industry by @CNET @CNET-ES @CBS Interactive. and elected a member of the National Academy of Engineering. In November 2017, Reif was elected a foreign member of the Chinese Academy of Engineering.

Corporate affiliations
Since 2007, Reif has served on the Board of Directors of Schlumberger, where he is on the Nominating and Governance Committee and the Science and Technology Committee and currently owns approximately $1,000,000 in stock. He is also a member of the Board of Conservation International, a nonprofit focused on sustainability and the environment.

Reif served on the Board of Directors of Alcoa from 2015-2016 and its public spin-off Arconic from 2016–2017.

Personal life
The Reif administration at MIT played an important role in the prosecution of Aaron Swartz, the founder of RSS and co-founder of Reddit, who was renowned for his anti-copyright (and "knowledge for all") activism on MIT campus.

Reif and his wife, Christine (Chomiuk), lived in Newton, Massachusetts prior to his appointment as MIT's 17th president, and for his first seven months; he now lives in the MIT Presidential Residence, Gray House. They have a daughter, Jessica, and a son, Blake. Jessica is Dr. Reif's daughter from his first marriage.

See also 

 Involvement in handling Aaron Swartz case.

References

External links
 Board of Trustees at World Economic Forum
 Board of Trustees at Carnegie Endowment 
 Official MIT President’s website
 
 
 

1950 births
Living people
American electrical engineers
American inventors
American people of Venezuelan-Jewish descent
American science writers
Fellows of the American Academy of Arts and Sciences
Jewish American scientists
Jewish American writers
Jewish engineers
MIT School of Engineering faculty
Massachusetts Institute of Technology provosts
Writers from Newton, Massachusetts
Stanford University School of Engineering alumni
Venezuelan emigrants to the United States
Venezuelan Jews
People from Maracaibo
Presidents of the Massachusetts Institute of Technology
Carnegie Endowment for International Peace
Foreign members of the Chinese Academy of Engineering
21st-century American Jews